Abdrakhmanovo (Abdraxman) is a rural locality (a village) in Tukayevsky Selsoviet of Aurgazinsky District, Bashkortostan, Russia. The population was 147 as of 2010. There are 3 streets.

Geography 
Abdrakhmanovo is located 31 km north of Tolbazy (the district's administrative centre) by road. Akhmetovo is the nearest rural locality.

Ethnicity 
The village is inhabited by Tatars and Bashkirs.

References 

Rural localities in Aurgazinsky District